62P/Tsuchinshan, also known as Tsuchinshan 1, is a periodic comet discovered on 1965 January 1 at Purple Mountain Observatory, Nanking. It will next come to perihelion on 25 December 2023 at around apparent magnitude 8.

During the 2004 perihelion passage the comet brightened to about apparent magnitude 11. The comet was not observed during the 2011 unfavorable apparition since the perihelion passage occurred when the comet was on the far side of the Sun.

See also
List of numbered comets

References

External links 
 Orbital simulation from JPL (Java) / Horizons Ephemeris
 62P/Tsuchinshan 1 – Seiichi Yoshida @ aerith.net
 Elements and Ephemeris for 62P/Tsuchinshan – Minor Planet Center
  62P/Tsuchinshan  at the Minor Planet Center's Database
 62P/Tsuchinshan – Kazuo Kinoshita (2006 Oct. 10)
 62P – Gary W. Kronk's Cometography

Periodic comets
0062
Comets in 2011
Comets in 2017
19650101